As I Was Moving Ahead Occasionally I Saw Brief Glimpses of Beauty is a 2000 experimental documentary film directed by Jonas Mekas. The film had its world premiere on November 4, 2000, at the London Film Festival and is a compilation of Mekas' home movies.

Synopsis
Compiled from Mekas' home movies, the film is an attempt by the director to re-construct his life through various home movies filmed over a period of about 30 years. Events shown in the film are things such as birthdays and picnics, as well as more landmark personal events such as the first steps of his children. Throughout the film Mekas offers his own commentary and insight on what the viewer is seeing.

Reception
Critical reception for the film has been mostly positive and Allmovie users rated the film 3 out of 5 stars. The New York Times commented that the film was "a first — the home movie as epic" and stated that "Mr. Mekas provides more of an immersion into his personal life than he has allowed anyone to view before in the welter of films he has built up over his career." The Village Voice called the movie an "unabashedly happy film" and noted that "Mekas plays this up with several wry comments, once calling his work 'a film about people who never argue or have fights and love each other.'"

References

External links

2000 films
2000s avant-garde and experimental films
2000 documentary films
2000 independent films
American avant-garde and experimental films
American documentary films
American independent films
Films directed by Jonas Mekas
Films about Lithuanian-American culture
2000s English-language films
2000s American films